An-Najaf Stadium is a multi-use stadium located in Najaf, Iraq. It is currently used mostly for football matches and serves as the home stadium of Najaf football club. The stadium holds 12,000 people.

See also 
List of football stadiums in Iraq

Football venues in Iraq
Najaf